Tata i zetovi was a Bosnian television sitcom.

The first episode of the show was aired on 29 October 2006. The final, 26th episode of the sitcom was aired on 19 April 2007.

See also 
 Top lista nadrealista
 Viza za budućnost
 Lud, zbunjen, normalan
 Memoari porodice Milić

References

External links 
 
 

Bosnia and Herzegovina culture
Bosnia and Herzegovina television series
Bosnia and Herzegovina television sitcoms
2000s Bosnia and Herzegovina television series